Bika may refer to the following people:
John Bika (died 1989), Bougainvillean politician
Obert Bika (born 1993), Papua New Guinean football midfielder
Rao Bika, 15th century founder of the Indian city and principality of Bikaner 
Sakio Bika (born 1979), Cameroonian-Australian boxer 
Victor Nendaka Bika (1923–2002), Congolese politician